Altha Lake is a lake in the Sierra Nevada in eastern Madera County, California.

It is within the boundaries of the Ansel Adams Wilderness, and in the Sierra National Forest.

History
Altha Lake was likely named for Altha Branson Summers, the wife of a local hotel owner.

See also
List of lakes in California

References

Lakes of Madera County, California
Lakes of the Sierra Nevada (United States)
Sierra National Forest
Lakes of Northern California
Lakes of California